Hhadydia Minte (born March 16, 1991 in Paris) is a French basketball player for Flammes Carolo basket and the French national team. She played for club USO Mondeville Basket of the Ligue Féminine de Basketball the top league of basketball of women in France.

She participated at the EuroBasket Women 2017.

References

1991 births
Living people
French women's basketball players
Basketball players from Paris
Small forwards